is the wife of Yasuo Fukuda, former Prime Minister of Japan.

She majored in psychology at Keio University.

Fukuda's cousin Seiichi Ōta was Minister of Agriculture, Forestry and Fisheries in her husband's cabinet.

Gallery

References

Living people
1944 births
People from Tokyo
Keio University alumni
Spouses of prime ministers of Japan